Dia Beacon is the museum for the Dia Art Foundation's collection of art from the 1960s to the present and is one of the 11 locations and sites they manage. The museum, which opened in 2003, is situated on the banks of the Hudson River in Beacon, New York. Dia Beacon's facility, the Riggio Galleries, is a former Nabisco box-printing facility that was renovated by Dia with artist Robert Irwin and architects Alan Koch, Lyn Rice, Galia Solomonoff, and Linda Taalman, then of OpenOffice. Along with Dia's permanent collection, Dia Beacon also presents temporary exhibitions, as well as public programs designed to complement the collection and exhibitions, including monthly Gallery Talks, Merce Cunningham Dance Company Events, Community Free Days for neighboring counties, and an education program that serves area students at all levels. With , it is one of the largest exhibition spaces in the country for modern and contemporary art.

Overview
Dia pioneered the conversion of industrial buildings for the installation of contemporary art, a practice and aesthetic now widely adopted by museums and galleries internationally. Dia's most recent conversion, its museum in Beacon, is located in a former printing plant built in 1929 by Nabisco (National Biscuit Company).  The museum is sited on thirty-one acres near the banks of the Hudson River, and is adjacent to ninety acres of riverfront parkland. It is a five-minute walk from the Metro-North train station in Beacon, 60 miles (80 minutes by train) north of New York City.

Dia Beacon's expansive spaces are well suited to the needs of large-scale installations, paintings, and sculptures. In keeping with Dia's history of single-artist, site-related presentations, each gallery was designed specifically for the art it contains. This includes Andy Warhol's 1978–79 multipart work Shadows, displayed in a single installation measuring approximately 350 linear feet; selections from Dan Flavin's series of fluorescent light Monuments to V. Tatlin (1964–81); Richard Serra's monumental steel sculptures, Torqued Ellipses; and Michael Heizer's North, East, South, West (1967/2002).

Dia collaborated with American artist Robert Irwin and architect OpenOffice to formulate the plan for the museum building and its exterior setting. The grounds include an entrance court and parking lot with a grove of flowering fruit trees and a formal garden, both of which were designed by Irwin. The adjacent Long Dock Park on the Hudson River has a site-specific work by environmental sculptor George Trakas.

Gallery

See also
Dia Art Foundation
Storm King Art Center, in Mountainville, New York, 13 miles from Dia Beacon

References

External links

Dia Art Foundation

Industrial buildings completed in 1929
National Register of Historic Places in Dutchess County, New York
Industrial buildings and structures on the National Register of Historic Places in New York (state)
Beacon, New York
Art museums and galleries in New York (state)
Contemporary art galleries in the United States
Museums in Dutchess County, New York
Art museums established in 2003
2003 establishments in New York (state)